Nes Radio is a Bosnian commercial radio station, broadcasting from Banja Luka. Radio was founded by Nezavisne novine publishing house and newspapers on 1 June 1997.

Nes Radio's sister station intended for the local audience in Banja Luka is radio Nes Castra.

Frequencies
The program is currently broadcast at 6 frequencies in 5 Bosnian cities:
 Sarajevo  
 Banja Luka  
 Banja Luka 
 Kneževo, Bosnia and Herzegovina  
 Tešanj  
 Velika Kladuša

References

External links 
 Official website Nes Radio
 Communications Regulatory Agency of Bosnia and Herzegovina

See also 
List of radio stations in Bosnia and Herzegovina

Radio stations in Bosnia and Herzegovina
Radio stations established in 1997
Mass media in Banja Luka